Mamia Orakhelashvili (Ivan (Mamia) Dmitrievich Orakhelashvili; June 10, 1881 – December 11, 1937) was a Georgian Bolshevik and Soviet politician energetically involved in the revolutionary movement in Russia and Georgia.

Early life and career 

Born in the Kutais Governorate, Imperial Russia (in present-day Georgia) in the family of a landlord, Orakhelashvili studied medicine at the University of Kharkiv and St. Petersburg Military Medical Academy. He joined the Bolshevik faction of the Russian Social Democratic Labour Party in 1903 and took an active part in the 1905 uprising in Petersburg. Between 1906 and 1914 he was arrested by the Tsarist police several times.

Russian Revolution 

After the 1917 Bolshevik seizure of power, Orakhelashvili chaired the Vladikavkaz Soviet. Between 1918 and 1920 he worked in the underground Bolshevik group in the Democratic Republic of Georgia, and was arrested by the Georgian government. He was released in accordance to the Moscow Treaty between Georgia and Soviet Russia (May 1920) and became chairman of the recently legalized Georgian Communist party. In February 1921, he participated in a Bolshevik diversion in southern Georgia, which was used by Vladimir Lenin’s government as a pretext for the Red Army invasion of Georgia. He provided the preface to Тайны меньшевистского царства (Secrets of Menshevik Georgia) by Iakov Moiseyevich Shafir (1921) in which archival material was used to justify the Soviet invasion.

In Soviet Georgia 

After the Sovietization of Georgia, Orakhelashvili served as chairman of the Georgian Revkom and secretary of the Central Committee of the Georgian Communist Party. He later became deputy chairman of the Georgian Council of People’s Commissars and chairman of the Transcaucasian SFSR Council of People’s Commissars. Between 1923 and 1937, he served as deputy chairman of the USSR Council of People’s Commissars and first secretary of the Transcaucasian Communist Party Committee and was one of the most influential Soviet officials in the Caucasus.

In 1930, Orakhelashvili joined the editorial board of the Communist Party newspaper Pravda. In 1932, he was appointed a deputy director of the Marx-Engels-Lenin Institute and authored several works on Communist Party history and Bolshevik activities in Transcaucasia and Georgia. His historic descriptions of the period in question did not particularly meet the Stalinist version of the events.

During the Great Purge in 1937, he was arrested and executed. His wife Mariam Orakhelashvili, the Minister of Education of the Georgian SSR was tortured and shot in prison. Their daughter, Ketevan, was sent to a Gulag camp, and her husband, the prominent conductor Evgeni Mikeladze, tortured to death. They were rehabilitated in 1955.

References

1880s births
1937 deaths
People from Kutaisi
politicians from Kutaisi
20th-century politicians from Georgia (country)
First Secretaries of the Georgian Communist Party
Revolutionaries from Georgia (country)
Great Purge victims from Georgia (country)
Old Bolsheviks
People from Kutais Governorate
Heads of government of the Transcaucasian SFSR
Soviet rehabilitations
Pravda people
S.M. Kirov Military Medical Academy alumni
First Secretaries of the Communist Party of the Transcaucasian SFSR